Hampton Roads Publishing Company, founded in 1989 by Frank DeMarco and Bob Friedman, is a publisher of self-help books, and books on alternative medicine, visionary fiction, New Thought, New Science, Nagualism and psychic realms.

Hampton Roads sold Walsch's Conversations with God: Book I to Susan J. Petersen, who published it for Putnam.

References

Book publishing companies based in Massachusetts
Publishing companies established in 1989
New Thought literature
Companies based in Newburyport, Massachusetts